Salvetti is an Italian surname. Notable people with the surname include:

Alida Maria Salvetti (1941-1991), Italian operatic soprano 
Antonio Salvetti (1854–1931), Italian architect and painter
Emiliano Salvetti (born 1974), Italian footballer
Maria Vittoria Salvetti, Italian aerospace engineer

Italian-language surnames